Haplothrix is a genus of longhorn beetles of the subfamily Lamiinae, containing the following species:

 Haplothrix amicator (Gahan, 1888)
 Haplothrix andamanicus (Breuning, 1979)
 Haplothrix andrewesi Breuning, 1935
 Haplothrix blairi Breuning, 1935
 Haplothrix fouqueti (Pic, 1932)
 Haplothrix griseatus (Gahan, 1888)
 Haplothrix paramicator Breuning, 1965
 Haplothrix pulcher (Hüdepohl, 1998)
 Haplothrix rivulosus (Gahan, 1888)
 Haplothrix simplex Gahan, 1888
 Haplothrix strandi Breuning, 1935

References

Lamiini